"Take It All Back" is a song written and recorded by American folk band Judah & the Lion, released as a single from their second studio album Folk Hop N' Roll. It was released by the band's label, Cletus the Van Records.

Music video 
The first music video for the song was released on July 28, 2016. A second music video was uploaded on the band's VEVO channel on January 17, 2017.

Reception

Chart performance 
"Take It All Back" was the band's first entry on the Alternative Songs chart in the United States, reaching number one.

Charts

Year-end charts

Certifications

References 

2016 singles
2016 songs